Gjøvik District Court was a district court in Innlandet county, Norway. The court was based in Gjøvik. The court existed from 2009 until 2021. It served the municipalities of Gjøvik, Lunner, Gran, Søndre Land, Nordre Land, Østre Toten, and Vestre Toten. Cases from this court could be appealed to Eidsivating Court of Appeal.

The court was a court of first instance. Its judicial duties were mainly to settle criminal cases and to resolve civil litigation as well as bankruptcy. The administration and registration tasks of the court included death registration, issuing certain certificates, performing duties of a notary public, and officiating civil wedding ceremonies. Cases from this court were heard by a combination of professional judges and lay judges.

History
The court was created on 1 January 2009, when the old Toten District Court and Hadeland og Land District Court were merged. Jevnaker Municipality was a part of the Hadeland og Land District Court prior to 2009, but on that date it was moved to the jurisdiction of the Ringerike District Court rather than joining the new Gjøvik District Court. On 26 April 2021, Gjøvik District Court was merged with the Nord-Gudbrandsdal District Court, Sør-Gudbrandsdal District Court, and Valdres District Court to create the new Vestre Innlandet District Court.

References

Defunct district courts of Norway
Organisations based in Gjøvik
2009 establishments in Norway
Courts and tribunals established in 2009
2021 disestablishments in Norway